In macroeconomics, the Inada conditions, named after Japanese economist Ken-Ichi Inada, are assumptions about the shape of a function, usually applied to a production function or a utility function. When the production function of a neoclassical growth model satisfies the Inada conditions, then it guarantees the stability of an economic growth path. The conditions as such had been introduced by Hirofumi Uzawa.

Statement

Economically this implies that the marginal returns for input  are positive, i.e. , but decreasing, i.e. 
the limit of the first derivative is positive infinity as  approaches 0: , meaning that the effect of the first unit of input  has the largest effect
the limit of the first derivative is zero as  approaches positive infinity: , meaning that the effect of one additional unit of input  is 0 when approaching the use of infinite units of

Consequences

It can be shown that the Inada conditions imply that the elasticity of substitution between components is asymptotically equal to one (although the production function is not necessarily asymptotically Cobb–Douglas, a commonplace production function for which this condition holds).
 
In stochastic neoclassical growth model, if the production function does not satisfy the Inada condition at zero, any feasible path converges to zero with probability one provided that the shocks are sufficiently volatile.

References

Further reading 
 
 
 

Economic growth